Koningsdag or King's Day is a national holiday in the Kingdom of the Netherlands. Celebrated on 27 April (26 April if the 27th is a Sunday), the date marks the birth of King Willem-Alexander. When the Dutch monarch is female, the holiday is known as Koninginnedag or Queen's Day and, under Queen Beatrix until 2013, was celebrated on 30 April.

The holiday was initially observed on 31 August 1885 as Prinsessedag or Princess's Day, the fifth birthday of Princess Wilhelmina, then heir presumptive to the Dutch throne. On her accession in November 1890 the holiday acquired the name Koninginnedag, first celebrated on 31 August 1891. In September 1948, Wilhelmina's daughter Juliana ascended to the throne and the holiday was moved to her birthday, 30 April. The holiday was celebrated on this date from 1949.

Juliana's daughter, Beatrix, retained the celebration on 30 April after she ascended the throne in 1980, though her birthday was on 31 January. Beatrix altered her mother's custom of receiving a floral parade at Soestdijk Palace, instead choosing to visit different Dutch towns each year and join in the festivities with her children.

In 2009, the Queen was celebrating Queen's Day in the city of Apeldoorn when a man attempted to attack her by trying to ram the royal family's bus with his car; instead he drove into a crowd of people and crashed into a monument: seven people in the crowd were killed, as was the driver.

Queen Beatrix abdicated on Koninginnedag 2013, and her son, Willem-Alexander, ascended the throne (the first king since the observance of the national holiday). As a result, the holiday became known as Koningsdag from 2014 on, and the celebration was moved three days ahead to 27 April, his actual birthday.

Koningsdag is known for its nationwide vrijmarkt ("free market"), at which the Dutch sell their used items. It is also an opportunity for "orange madness" or oranjegekte, a kind of frenzy named for the national colour.

History

Wilhelmina (1885–1948)

Faced with an unpopular monarchy, in the 1880s the liberals in Dutch government sought a means of promoting national unity. King William III was disliked, but his four-year-old daughter Princess Wilhelmina was not. A holiday honouring King William had been intermittently held on his birthday, and J. W. R. Gerlach, editor of the newspaper Utrechts Provinciaal en Stedelijk Dagblad, proposed that the princess's birthday be observed as an opportunity for patriotic celebration and national reconciliation. Prinsessedag or Princess's Day was first celebrated in the Netherlands on 31 August 1885, Wilhelmina's fifth birthday. The young princess was paraded through the streets, waving to the crowds. The first observance occurred only in Utrecht, but other municipalities quickly began to observe it, organizing activities for children. Further processions were held in the following years, and when Wilhelmina inherited the throne in 1890, Prinsessedag was renamed Koninginnedag, or Queen's Day. By then almost every Dutch town and city was marking the holiday.

The celebration proved popular, and when the Queen came of age in 1898, her inauguration was postponed six days to 6 September so as not to interfere with Koninginnedag. The annual holiday fell on the final day of school summer vacation, which made it popular among schoolchildren. It is uncertain how much Wilhelmina enjoyed the festivities; although writer Mike Peek, in a 2011 magazine article about Koninginnedag, suggests she was enthusiastic, there is a story of Wilhelmina, after a tired return from one of these birthday processions, making her doll bow until the toy's hair was dishevelled, and telling it, "Now you shall sit in a carriage and bow until your back aches, and see how much you like being a Queen!"

Koninginnedag 1902 not only honoured the Queen's birthday, but was celebrated with increased enthusiasm as it marked her recovery from serious illness. Wilhelmina rarely attended Koninginnedag festivities after reaching adulthood. She attended ceremonies for her silver jubilee in 1923, which included massive festivities in Amsterdam and The Hague, despite the Queen's request that large sums not be spent because economic conditions at the time were difficult. To ensure that even the poorer parts of the city were included, bands played simultaneously at 28 locations across The Hague. Wilhelmina made further exceptions for such events as her fiftieth birthday in 1930. During the German occupation of the Netherlands during World War II, Koninginnedag celebrations were banned, and members of the Orange Committees, which organize the holiday events, destroyed their records for fear of German reprisals.

Juliana (1948–1980)

Another summertime birthday celebration in the Netherlands was that of Wilhelmina's mother, Queen-Regent Emma, who after Wilhelmina attained adulthood generally spent her own birthday, 2 August, at Soestdijk Palace in Baarn. Until her death in 1934, Emma received an annual floral tribute from the townsfolk on her birthday. In 1937 Wilhelmina's daughter and heiress, Princess Juliana, took up residence at Soestdijk Palace following her marriage, and the townsfolk made their floral presentation to her, moving the date to Juliana's birthday, 30 April. In September 1948 Juliana ascended to the Dutch throne and from 1949 onwards Koninginnedag was on her birthday. The change in date attracted immediate approval from Dutch children, who gained an extra day of holiday. The first observance of the holiday on the new date included a huge circus at the Amsterdam Olympic Stadium—one not attended by the royal family, who remained at Soestdijk Palace. Queen Juliana retained the floral tribute, staying each year on Koninginnedag at Soestdijk Palace to receive it. The parade became televised in the 1950s, and Koninginnedag increasingly became a national holiday, with workers given the day off. Juliana had a reputation as a "queen of the people", and according to Peek, "it felt as if she invited her subjects to the royal home".

In early 1966 Juliana's eldest daughter, Princess Beatrix, married Klaus-Georg von Amsberg. The marriage was controversial because the new Prince Claus (as he was dubbed) was a German, and Claus himself had served in the German Army during the war.  Anti-German riots in Amsterdam marred the wedding day and the following observances of Koninginnedag. Fearing further demonstrations on the holiday, government officials decided to open Amsterdam city centre to the vrijmarkt ("free market") that had long been held on Koninginnedag in the outskirts of town, principally for children. The vrijmarkt occupied the space where demonstrations might have been held, and began a new custom.

Beatrix (1980–2013)

When Queen Beatrix succeeded her mother Juliana on the latter's abdication on 30 April 1980, the new queen decided to keep the holiday on 30 April as a tribute to her mother. (If 30 April fell on a Sunday, Koninginnedag was observed the previous day—this occurred most recently in 2006.) The reason was practical as well—Beatrix's actual birthday on 31 January would have been less conducive to the traditional outdoor activities. Rather than remaining at the palace and letting the Dutch people come to her, Beatrix instead usually visited two towns each year for Koninginnedag celebrations. Local crafts and customs were demonstrated for the royal family, who had the opportunity to join in.

Koninginnedag celebrations have sometimes been affected or disrupted. In 1988 three British servicemen stationed in Germany who were in the Netherlands for Koninginnedag were killed in Irish Republican Army attacks. In 1996 the celebrations in Rotterdam were dampened by an alcohol ban, put in place following riots earlier in the week after local football club Feyenoord won the Dutch league championship. The Queen's scheduled 2001 visits to Hoogeveen and Meppel were postponed for one year owing to an outbreak of foot-and-mouth disease.

On 30 April 2009, Beatrix and other members of the royal family were at the town of Apeldoorn when a 38-year-old man, Karst Tates, drove his Suzuki Swift automobile into the crowd, narrowly missing the open-top bus the royal family members were riding on. Seven people were killed and further celebrations were cancelled. Tates died of injuries sustained in the attack soon afterwards and his exact motives remain unclear, though it appears his target was the royal family. The incident provoked questions about whether the royal family should continue to participate in the celebrations. However, Beatrix indicated that the tragedy would not stop her from meeting her people. In 2010, Beatrix and her family visited Wemeldinge and Middelburg, in Zeeland province. There were no incidents, and afterwards, the Queen thanked Zeeland for giving Koninginnedag back to her family, and to her country.

Queen Beatrix visited the following towns and cities over the years on Koninginnedag:

1981: Veere and Breda
1982: Harlingen and Zuidlaren
1983: Lochem and Vaassen
1984: The Hague
1985: Anna Paulowna, Callantsoog, and Schagen
1986: Deurne and Meijel
1987: Breukelen
1988: Genemuiden, Kampen, and informally Amsterdam
1989: Goedereede and Oud-Beijerland
1990: Haren and Loppersum
1991: Buren and Culemborg
1992: Rotterdam
1993: Vlieland and Sneek
1994: Emmeloord and Urk
1995: Eijsden and Sittard
1996: Sint Maartensdijk and Bergen op Zoom
1997: Marken and Velsen
1998: Doesburg and Zutphen
1999: Houten and Utrecht
2000: Katwijk and Leiden
2001: visits cancelled
2002: Hoogeveen and Meppel
2003: Wijhe and Deventer
2004: Warffum and Groningen
2005: Scheveningen and The Hague
2006: Zeewolde and Almere
2007: Woudrichem and 's-Hertogenbosch
2008: Makkum and Franeker
2009: Apeldoorn (2009 attack on the Dutch royal family)
2010: Wemeldinge and Middelburg
2011: Weert and Thorn
2012: Rhenen and Veenendaal
2013: visits cancelled
On 28 January 2013 Queen Beatrix announced her abdication on 30 April 2013 in favour of her son, Willem-Alexander. Since this date coincided with Koninginnedag the royal family's planned visit to De Rijp and Amstelveen was cancelled, although Koninginnedag 2013 was still celebrated throughout the country.

Willem-Alexander

On 30 April 2013, Queen's Day, Willem-Alexander succeeded his mother Beatrix and became the first King of the Netherlands in 123 years. Consequently, from 2014 onwards the name has been changed from Queen's Day to King's Day. The date has also changed from 30 to 27 April, which is the actual birthday of Willem-Alexander. On the first King's Day – held on 26 April 2014 because 27 April 2014 was a Sunday – the king visited De Rijp and Amstelveen (originally planned to be visited by Queen Beatrix in 2013, but postponed due to her abdication).

King Willem-Alexander has visited the following towns and cities over the years on Koningsdag:

2014: De Rijp and Amstelveen
2015: Dordrecht
2016: Zwolle
2017: Tilburg
2018: Groningen
2019: Amersfoort
2020: visit cancelled 
2021: Eindhoven
2022: Maastricht
2023: Rotterdam

Due to the coronavirus pandemic, many King's day celebrations were cancelled in 2020, including the royal family's planned visit to Maastricht. An alternative stay-at-home program was issued instead, featuring a simultaneous national anthem sing-along and a national toast moment. The King addressed the Dutch people from his home.

Activities
The festivities on Koningsdag are often organised by Orange Committees (Dutch: Oranjecomité), local associations that seek sponsorship and donations for their activities. In recent years some committees have had difficulty in recruiting new members from among the younger Dutch.

Flea market

The vrijmarkt (literally 'free market') is a nationwide flea market, at which many people sell their used goods. Koningsdag is the one day of the year that the Dutch government permits sales on the street without a permit and without the payment of value added tax. ING Bank found in 2011 that one in five Dutch residents planned to sell at the vrijmarkt and estimated they would earn €100 per person for a total turnover of €290 million. Over half of the Dutch people buy at the vrijmarkt; ING Bank predicted they would spend €28 each at the 2011 vrijmarkt. Queen Beatrix has been known to buy at the vrijmarkt; in 1995 she purchased a floor lamp. The bank also forecast that the lowest level of sales at the vrijmarkt in 2011 would be in the province of Limburg, site of Queen Beatrix's visit.

Among the most popular areas for the vrijmarkt in Amsterdam is the Jordaan quarter, but the wide Apollolaan in front of the Hilton hotel in southern Amsterdam is gaining in popularity. Children sell their cast-off toys or garments at the Vondelpark, also in southern Amsterdam, and in a spirit of fun passers-by often offer the young sellers more than they are asking for the goods. Until 1996, the vrijmarkt began the evening before and continued for 24 hours. This was ended in the hope of gaining a pause in the celebrations so preparations could be made for the daytime activities. Utrecht, uniquely among Dutch municipalities, retains the overnight vrijmarkt. In 2020, people could sell their goods on an online platform to avoid physical contact with customers.

Festivities
Koningsdag now sees large-scale celebrations, with many concerts and special events in public spaces, particularly in Amsterdam. An outdoor concert is held on Amsterdam's Museumplein, where as many as 800,000 people may gather. To aid visitors in returning home by train after the festivities, outdoor events must end by 20:00, and the Museumplein show by 21:00. The city centre is closed to cars, and no trams ride in the heart of the city; people are urged to avoid Amsterdam Centraal railway station and use other stations if possible from their direction. International trains that normally depart or terminate at Amsterdam Centraal are instead directed to a suburban stop.

In recent years parties and concerts have been held the evening before Koningsdag. Until 2013, nightclubs across the Netherlands organised special events for what became known as Koninginnenacht (Queen's Night). Many young people celebrate in the streets and squares (and in Amsterdam, the canals as well) throughout the night, and after all-night partying join the crowds at the vrijmarkt.

While King's Day celebrations take place throughout the Netherlands, Amsterdam is a popular destination for many revellers. Often the city's 850,000 residents are joined by up to 1 million visitors. In recent years Amsterdam authorities have taken some measures to try to stem the flow of visitors as the city became too crowded.

Those taking part in Koningsdag commonly dye their hair orange or wear orange clothing in honour of the House of Orange-Nassau, which rules over the Netherlands. Orange-coloured drinks are also popular. This colour choice is sometimes dubbed "orange madness", or in Dutch, oranjegekte. A local Orange Committee member said of Koninginnedag in 2011:

Friendships—and community—will be formed. For me that's really what Queen's Day is all about. It's not an outburst of patriotism, it's not even about the popularity of the royal family. It's about a sense of belonging. For one day, everybody is the same in Holland. Bright orange and barmy.

Children celebrate with a variety of games including koekhappen (in which they catch spice cake dangling from a string in their mouths) and spijker poepen (in which they tie string around their waist with a nail dangling at one end, which they attempt to lower into a glass bottle).

Honours
Koningsdag is an opportunity for the monarch to honour citizens for their service to the Netherlands. In 2011, Queen Beatrix issued an honours list noting the work of 3,357 people, most of whom became members of the Order of Orange-Nassau.

Observance in Dutch territories outside Europe
Koningsdag is also celebrated in Aruba, Curaçao, and Sint Maarten, constituent countries of the Kingdom of the Netherlands. It is less widely celebrated on the Caribbean island of Bonaire, also a part of the Kingdom, where the local celebration of Dia di Rincon (held on 30 April) is more popular.

See also 
 King's Official Birthday in the United Kingdom and Commonwealth Realms
 Grand Duke's Official Birthday in Luxembourg
 The Emperor's Birthday in Japan
 King's Feast in Belgium

References

External links 
 
 

April observances
Dutch monarchy
Public holidays in the Netherlands
Dutch words and phrases
National days
National holidays
Birthdays of heads of state
Articles containing video clips
Annual events in the Netherlands
Spring (season) events in the Netherlands